Kaharlyk is a town in Kyiv Oblast (province) of Ukraine, located in Obukhiv Raion. Kaharlyk hosts the administration of Kaharlyk urban hromada, one of the hromadas of Ukraine.  Population:

History 
In 1858, a sugar plant was built here.

Later in the 19th century it was a center of Kagarlyk volost in Kievsky Uyezd of Kiev Governorate of the Russian Empire. 

In the 1930s a dairy plant was built here during industrialization.

During World War II it was occupied by Axis troops from August 3, 1941 until January 8, 1944.

In 1952, it was a large village. There were a sugar plant, a dairy plant, four schools, a library, one sovkhoz and one MTS.

Urban-type settlement from 1956 until 1971, town since 1971.

In January 1989, the population was 14,065, there were several food industry enterprises.

In 2011 a security checkpoint "Kaharlyk" was built here.

In January 2013, population was 13,758 people.

In May 2020, the 2020 Kaharlyk police rape gained widespread media attention across Ukraine, spurring protests.

Until 18 July 2020, Kaharlyk served as an administrative center of Kaharlyk Raion. The raion was abolished that day as part of the administrative reform of Ukraine, which reduced the number of raions of Kyiv Oblast to seven. The area of Kaharlyk Raion was merged into Obukhiv Raion.

Transport 
 a railway station of the Southwestern Railways

Gallery

References

Cities in Kyiv Oblast
1142 establishments in Europe
Cities of district significance in Ukraine
12th-century establishments in Ukraine